Rocket Punch (Korean: 로켓펀치; RR: roket peonchi; Japanese: ロケットパンチ; RR: Rokettopanchi or as RCPC) is a South Korean girl group, consisting of group members Juri, Yeonhee, Suyun, Yunkyoung, Sohee and Dahyun. Formed and managed by Woollim Entertainment, the group was announced in July 2019 and debuted on August 7, 2019, with their first EP Pink Punch.

History

Pre-debut
Juri was cast as an AKB48 12th-generation trainee through an audition in 2011. She was introduced to the public through AKB48 Team 4 in March 2012. Her first television appearance in Korea was in the 2018 reality competition show, Produce 48. Suyun and Sohee were introduced to the public as representative trainees of Woollim Entertainment through Produce 48 as well. In March 2019, Juri was confirmed to have signed with Woollim Entertainment to pursue her career in Korea by debuting as a member of the company's new girl group. Two months later, Juri officially graduated from AKB48.

2019–2020: Introduction, debut with Pink Punch, continues with Red Punch and Blue Punch 
On July 22, Woollim Entertainment revealed a motion clip with Rocket Punch's logo and speculated that the next girl group after Lovelyz. It was later confirmed with a concept film featuring all six members (Yeonhee, Juri, Suyun, Yunkyung, Sohee, and Dahyun) was released on July 23.

Rocket Punch's debut EP Pink Punch was released on August 7, 2019, with "Bim Bam Bum" serving as its lead single. A debut showcase was held in Yes24 Live Hall in Seoul, South Korea, following the release of their EP. The group held their first performance in Japan at the 2019 Girls Award Autumn/Winter Show.

The group made their comeback on February 10 with their second EP Red Punch and its lead single "Bouncy".

On August 4, the group released their third EP Blue Punch, and its lead single "Juicy".

2021–present: Ring Ring, Japanese debut, Yellow Punch, Flash
On May 17, 2021, Rocket Punch released their first single album Ring Ring, and its lead single of the same name.  The acoustic version of their lead single was released on July 15.

On May 24, Woollim Entertainment announced that Rocket Punch would be making their Japanese debut under Yoshimoto Kogyo.  They released their first Japanese EP Bubble Up! on August 4, with its lead title track of the same name being released on July 13.

On February 28, 2022, the group released their fourth EP Yellow Punch, with the lead single "Chiquita".

On March 11, 2022, Woollim Entertainment confirmed that Rocket Punch will hold both online and offline fan meetings which will be held on April 2 and 3, 2022.

On June 29, 2022, the group released the Japanese single "Fiore".

The group released their second single album Flash on August 29, 2022.

Members
 Juri Takahashi
 Kim Yeon-hee
 Kim Su-yun
 Seo Yun-kyoung
 Kim So-hee
 Jeong Da-hyun

Discography

Studio albums

Extended plays

Single albums

Singles

Compilation appearances

Music videos

Awards and nominations

Notes

References

Woollim Entertainment artists
K-pop music groups
Musical groups established in 2019
South Korean girl groups
Musical groups from Seoul
2019 establishments in South Korea